Astrantia bavarica, common name masterwort, is a species of flowering plant in the family Apiaceae, native to Eastern alps.

Etymology
The specific epithet bavarica, meaning "from bavaria". Bavaria is a state in Germany, which geographically distinguishes this species from its smaller relative Astrantia minor and from its larger relatives Astrantia major and Astrantia maxima.
Astrantia bavarica was described by Friedrich Wilhelm Schultz in 1858,
and published in Flora Vol.41 (issue 11) on page 161.

Description
Astrantia bavarica reaches on average  of height. The stem is erect and  glabrous, with little branches and few leaves. The basal leaves have a long petiole , 3 to 7 lobes and toothed segments. Size: . The cauline leaves are generally two, sessile, amplexicaul and  lanceolate-shaped with a trilobed apex. The small flowers are greenish-white (with pink undertones). The central ones are hermaphrodite, while the external ones are male. The flowering period extends from April through to November. 
It has a RHS Hardiness Rating: H7.

Reproduction

Astrantia bavarica is an entomophilous plant, mainly pollinated by beetles, but also by other insects. This perennial plant reproduces itself also by means of buds present at the ground level. It can also be grown from seed as well.

Distribution and habitat 
Astrantia bavarica is native to Europe, and found within Germany, Italy, Austria, Slovenia, and the eastern Alps.

References

 Walter Erhardt, Erich Götz, Nils Bödeker, Siegmund Seybold: Der große Zander. Eugen Ulmer KG, Stuttgart 2008, . (Ger.) 
 Christoper Brickell (Editor-in-chief): RHS A-Z Encyclopedia of Garden Plants. Third edition. Dorling Kindersley, London 2003, .

External links

 Astrantia bavarica F.W.Schultz | Plants of the World Online | Kew Science
 Astrantia bavarica F. W. Schultz - Encyclopedia of Life

Apioideae
Flora of Europe
Flora of the Pyrenees
Flora of Austria
Flora of Germany
Flora of Italy
Flora of Slovenia
Plants described in 1858